Laurence Laverty (born 1959) is an American character actor. His film roles include playing Larry Davies in The Hamiltons (2006), as well as appearances in Dead Tone (2007) and in Gus Van Sant's Elephant (2003). Laverty made television guest appearances in Judging Amy, The Practice, Breaking Vegas, Nash Bridges, and MADtv. His performance on The Tonight Show led to a number of appearances on daytime soap operas including Days of Our Lives, Passions, Port Charles, and All My Children.

He is also a writer and photographer and, in 2019, published a book of photography entitled Power and Majesty: The Plight and Preservation of the African Elephant.

Early life 

Laverty was born in 1959 in Berkeley, California, and grew up in nearby Oakland. His father was an engineer and a veteran of World War II, and his mother was a bookkeeper and historian. Laverty was an Eagle Scout, as well as a member of the Sierra Club and the Audubon Society. He graduated from Skyline High School in Oakland and then moved to Kuna, Idaho, to live on the family farm while he worked a variety of jobs. He earned two college degrees, in business administration and political science, from Boise State University, which included attending an acting class during his last year before graduating in 1985. He also undertook graduate studies at Johns Hopkins University.

Career 
Laverty performed on stage in a number of plays and musicals while studying acting with the American Conservatory Theater, The Groundlings, and The Second City. He spent 11 years living in Milwaukee, Wisconsin, in Calgary, Alberta, and in Butte, Montana, while he trained in the hopes of joining the U.S. Olympics team as a speedskater. In 1990, his second film appearance was in a minor role as a soldier in John Frankenheimer's The Fourth War.

Some of Laverty's earliest appearances in a lead role were in two early short films by Irish filmmaker Dermot Tynan, A Talk in the Dark and The Biscuit Eaters. Within the same year, he acted in a Canadian movie production, Icetime, with Canadian actor Jackson Davies.

Laverty has appeared in more than 100 films, including Gus Van Sant's Elephant (2003), What's Bugging Seth? (2005), Further North (2008), The Wylds (2010), Cut (2011), American Disciples (2011), Radio Dreams (2016), and The Control Group (2014). He was also a producer of several films including Kid (1993), which premiered at the Sundance Film Festival, Most of the Time (2016), and Gods In Shackles (2016).

Laverty has appeared in a number of horror films. He appeared in the 2007 film Dead Tone in a supporting role. The next year, he appeared in the Antony De Gennaro film Son of Terror and the Phillip Grasso film ChainSmoke. He has also appeared in a number of television roles including Days of Our Lives, Judging Amy, The Practice, and All My Children. In 2016, Laverty traveled to Ireland to work once again with Tynan in Most of the Time (2016). He starred in a lead role and was also co-producer of the short film.

Photography and conservation 
Laverty began photography at the age of 5. From 2010 to 2015, Laverty images were published in the MacArthur Metro, a newspaper serving Oakland, California, for which he also was a columnist. Beginning in 2015 onward, his images of wildlife in Africa were published by numerous international wildlife conservation organizations.

In 2017, he began taking part in speaking engagements that focused on the plight of the African elephant, engagements that revolved around the presentation of his images taken while spending six months in Africa. In 2019, he released a table-top book of images and observations on African elephants entitled Power and Majesty: The Plight and Preservation of the African Elephant.

Filmography 
Laverty has appeared in more than 100 films and televisions series, including:

References

External links 

1959 births
Living people
American male film actors
Male actors from Oakland, California
Male actors from Berkeley, California
American male television actors
21st-century American male actors
20th-century American male actors
Boise State University alumni